The W. G. Bagnall New Standard 18  is a type of industrial steam locomotive manufactured at W. G. Bagnall's Castle Engine Works and designed by Harold Wood at W.G. Bagnall in 1951. The class was specifically designed for the Port Talbot Steelworks, and ran from 1951 to 1973 in industrial service. Two locomotives (2994 & 2996), the former Longbridge locomotives, are preserved.

Construction 
The three locomotives were ordered in 1950 and completed in 1951 with the Bagnall works numbers 2994–2996. The works numbers are what the locomotives are more commonly referred to today.

Design 

[[File:Bagnall 0-6-0ST 2994 Vulcan, Terrier & 0-4-0ST WSR Minehead June 1980 Slides222 (9972221246).jpg|thumb|2994 Vulcan"]]
Three locomotives were ordered by the Steel Company of Wales (SCOW) for their Abbey, Margam and Port Talbot works during the early 1950s, to replace the elderly locomotives which were running at that time. The Steel Company of Wales wanted to see how steam locomotives compared against diesel locomotives, but because the elderly steam locos that they had at that time, did not give a modern and fair view on steam locomotives, they ordered large and specially designed tank locomotives from W.G Bagnall, who had provided 2 powerful 0-4-0ST locomotives to Port Talbot in the 1930s. SCOW were testing to see whether steam or diesel was more economical and also to see which motive power was better on the duties at the steelworks.

W.G Bagnall intended, for the New Standard 18 locomotives to be their new standard, post war heavy shunter. But with diesel locomotives becoming more popular in the industrial locomotive markets, the Steel Company of Wales would become the only customer. W.G Bagnall merging with Brush Traction in 1951 to create Brush Bagnall Traction Limited, Brush Bagnall focused more on diesel locomotives and Brush Bagnall would later supply the Port Talbot and fundamentally replace the W.G Bagnall steam locomotives with Brush Bagnall diesel locomotives.

A distinctive feature of these engines was their use of external valve gear. Using external cylinders, piston valves and Walschaerts valve gear rather than the more common Stephenson link, the locomotives incorporated features the same post-war trends that also appeared in the BR Standard classes, but they were largely alien to traditional industrial saddle tanks.

The locomotives had a wide range of features, that were very uncommon on industrial locomotives. Features included: piston valves, roller-type big-end and side-rod bearings, manganese steel axle-box and horn plate liners, hopper ashpans, self-cleaning smokeboxes, rocking grates and Lambets wet sanding. Steel fireboxes were used as well as "Owens" patent poppet valve and balanced regulator valves. As was usual for short-journey locomotives they were not fitted with superheating, as short journeys allow little time for the superheater elements to reach working temperature.

The dimensions of the class were comparable to the Hunslet Austerity 0-6-0ST, widely used for similar purposes. The Bagnall locomotives had  of tractive effort, which was higher than the Hunslet locomotives tractive effort of 23,870 lbf (106.18 kN) and second only to the Peckett OQ Class with 29,527 lbf of tractive effort.

 Steel Company of Wales 
The locomotives when they first arrived at Port Talbot, were given the running numbers: 401 (Works no 2994), 402 (Works no 2995), and 403 (Works no 2996). The locomotives ran at the Port Talbot site. The three locos performed above and beyond the requirements of their original design specification however the decision was made in favour of diesel power and by 1957 all three were replaced by Brush Bagnall diesel locomotives. The locomotives while in service at Port Talbot, were noted for their impressive reliability and availability. 2994 was sold, with sister 2996, to the Austin Motor Company Ltd. (later to become British Leyland) for use at their Longbridge plant in Birmingham. 
At Longbridge the two locos received the names Victor and Vulcan'' a reference to the RAF V bombers then entering service. 
2995 was never named and was sold to a scrap and plant dealer in South Wales who later sold it on to the National Coal Board for use at one of their collieries in South Wales.

Post Steel Company of Wales Service

2994 and 2996 (Vulcan and Victor)

After an approach by the Austin Motor Company Ltd (later to become British Leyland) 2994 and 2996 were sold to Austin for use at their Longbridge plant in Birmingham where they ran successfully until withdrawal in 1972. Workers at the Longbridge factory, reportedly saw the new Brush Bagnall diesel locomotives being delivered and saw the signs on the side. Which led to Austin making an inquiry. In Austin ownership, it was the longest the two locomotives ran in industrial service as they only ran for six years under their previous owners. The work at Longbridge at Longbridge being much less substantial, than what they had to do at Port Talbot.

2995 

2995 was not required by Austin and was sold to a scrap and plant dealer in South Wales from whom it was purchased by the National Coal Board for use at one of their collieries in South Wales until problems developed with its steel firebox. Steel fireboxes are less tolerant of poor maintenance and it is likely that the loco did not receive boiler washouts as regularly as should have been the case. Serious consideration was given to replacing the boiler with one from a Great Western Railway pannier tank locomotive. But this idea was not pursued and the loco was subsequently scrapped on site in 1967.

Preservation
2994 and 2996 were purchased from Longbridge in 1973 for use on the West Somerset Railway. Initially stored at Taunton, Victor was the first locomotive used on West Somerset Railway, and from December 1975 along with GWR 6412 worked service trains once the West Somerset re-opened in 1976. Vulcan was brought into service the following year. The class were never intended, nor suited, for operation over such a long line but in the right hands could put up some remarkable performances. However their rough riding, a consequence of their short wheelbase and long overhangs, earned them the nickname "Camel class".  2994, out of service and by now with its roller bearings in poor condition was sold in 1986 and is currently at the North Tyneside Steam Railway, operational. As train lengths grew on the WSR and more suitable motive power became available 2996 was sold in 1989 moving initially to the Strathspey Railway. After subsequent spells on both the Battlefield Line and the Great Central Railway (Nottingham) it has been under overhaul as well at the Lakeside and Haverthwaite Railway, and has since been put back into working service.

Fleet list

See also 
 Hunslet Austerity 0-6-0ST, a comparable locomotive from Hunslet
 W. G. Bagnall
 Bagnall fireless locomotives (preserved)
 Bagnall 0-4-0ST "Alfred" and "Judy"
 Bagnall 0-4-0ST No. 19

Notes

References 

Bagnall locomotives
0-6-0ST locomotives
Industrial locomotives of Great Britain
Standard gauge steam locomotives of Great Britain
Railway locomotives introduced in 1951
Shunting locomotives